Mićo Smiljanić (born 4 September 1974) is a Serbian former footballer who played as a defender.

Career
After playing for Spartak Subotica, Smiljanić moved abroad and joined Hungarian club Diósgyőr in 1998. He would spend most of his playing career in Hungary, winning the national championship with MTK Hungária in 2003. Throughout the years, Smiljanić also played professionally in Israel (Ashdod) and Greece (Panionios).

Honours
MTK Hungária
 Nemzeti Bajnokság I: 2002–03
Budapest Honvéd
 Magyar Kupa: 2006–07, 2008–09
Sopron
 Nemzeti Bajnokság III: 2010–11

References

External links

 
 

1974 births
Living people
People from Apatin
Serbia and Montenegro footballers
Serbian footballers
Association football defenders
FK Mladost Apatin players
FK Spartak Subotica players
Diósgyőri VTK players
F.C. Ashdod players
MTK Budapest FC players
Panionios F.C. players
Budapest Honvéd FC players
Soproni VSE players
First League of Serbia and Montenegro players
Second League of Serbia and Montenegro players
Nemzeti Bajnokság I players
Israeli Premier League players
Super League Greece players
Serbian SuperLiga players
Nemzeti Bajnokság II players
Nemzeti Bajnokság III players
Serbia and Montenegro expatriate footballers
Serbian expatriate footballers
Expatriate footballers in Hungary
Expatriate footballers in Israel
Expatriate footballers in Greece
Serbia and Montenegro expatriate sportspeople in Hungary
Serbia and Montenegro expatriate sportspeople in Israel
Serbia and Montenegro expatriate sportspeople in Greece
Serbian expatriate sportspeople in Hungary